13 Minutes may refer to:

 13 Minutes (2015 film), German film
 13 Minutes (2021 film), American film